Glu3D is a plugin that simulates fluid effects inside the 3dsmax and Maya3D modelling programs.

Simulation 

Glu3d uses SPH, or Smoothed particle hydrodynamics to solve fluid simulations. 
Adjustments can be made to the collision geometry by modifying the Friction, Adherence, Bounce and Collision GAP values to each object.

PWrapper 

PWrapper is a polygonal mesh surface generator that works in conjunction with glu3D particles to generate a mesh surrounding the particles in realtime. This helps to give a liquid behavior to any particle set with no need to wait for inter-particle interaction calculation times.

Wetmaps 

Glu3d is also able to generate image sequences called Wetmaps that simulate the wet surface of an object.
Wetmaps, if enabled, are generated in a per-object basis, which means that every object has its own wetmap sequence, that is created based on the objects UV Mapping

External links 
Developer Website It is possible to download a demo version of the software.
Glu3d Forum
Tutorials Page Several tutorials are available to help getting started with glu3d.

3D graphics software